Hacılar is a village in the Gölbaşı District, Adıyaman Province, Turkey. Its population is 182 (2021).

References

Villages in Gölbaşı District, Adıyaman Province